Hanna Kristina Schmitz (born as Sjögren-Devrient 7 August  1976) is a Swedish actress. She has worked at theaters such as Malmö Stadsteater in Malmö, Spegelteatern, Strindbergs Intima theater and the experimental dance-theater Weld.

References

1976 births
Swedish stage actresses
21st-century Swedish actresses
Living people